Popovich or Popović is a surname.

Popovich may also refer to:
 Popovich, Varna Province, a village in Bulgaria
 8444 Popovich, an asteroid
 Popovich Hall, home of the Marshall School of Business at the University of Southern California
 Karina Popovich, founder of Makers for COVID-19